Carlia beccarii is a species of skink, a lizard in the subfamily Eugongylinae of the family Scincidae. The species is endemic to Indonesia.

Etymology
The specific name, beccarii, is in honor of Italian botanist Odoardo Beccari.

Description
Males are larger than females, an example of sexual dimorphism.

Reproduction
C. beccarii is oviparous.

References

Further reading
Boulenger GA (1887). Catalogue of the Lizards in the British Museum (Natural History). Second Edition. Volume III. ... Scincidæ .... London: Trustees of the British Museum (Natural History). (Taylor and Francis, printers). xii + 575 pp. + Plates I–XL. (Lygosoma beccarii, p. 285).
Peters W, Doria G (1878). "Catalogo dei rettili e dei batraci raccolti da O. Beccari, L. M. D'Albertis e A. A. Bruijn nella sotto-regione austro-malese ". Annali del Museo Civico di Storia Naturale di Genova 13: 323–450. (Heteropus beccarii, new species, p.  361). (in Italian and Latin).
Zug GR (2004). "Systematics of the Carlia "fusca" lizards (Squamata: Scincidae) of New Guinea and Nearby Islands". Bishop Museum Bulletin of Zoology 5: 1–83. (Carlia beccarii, new combination, p. 59).

Carlia
Reptiles described in 1878
Reptiles of Indonesia
Endemic fauna of Indonesia
Taxa named by Wilhelm Peters
Taxa named by Giacomo Doria